The Arthur Askey Show was a short-lived black-and-white British sitcom starring Arthur Askey that ran for six episodes in 1961. It was written by Dave Freeman. It was made for the ITV network by ATV. The following year Askey appeared in another series Raise Your Glasses on the BBC.

Cast
Arthur Askey – Arthur Pilbeam
June Whitfield – Emily Pilbeam
Arthur Mullard – Mr. Rossiter
Patricia Hayes – Mrs. Rossiter

Plot
The Arthur Askey Show was set in 1910, and Arthur Pilbeam's wife, Emily, was considerably younger than he was. The next door neighbours are Mr. and Mrs. Rossiter. Amongst the guest stars to make appearances were Sam Kydd, who had appeared in Arthur's Treasured Volumes the year before, and Guy Middleton.

Episodes
"Episode One" (11 Mar 1961)
"Episode Two" (18 Mar 1961)
"Pilbeam, the Journalist" (25 Mar 1961)
"Episode Four" (1 Apr 1961)
"Episode Five" (8 Apr 1961)
"Episode Six" (15 Apr 1961)

Six more episodes were made, but they were never transmitted. All twelve episodes still exist.

1959 show
The Arthur Askey Show was also the name of a six-part ITV stand-up and sketch show featuring Arthur Askey that ran sporadically from 28 February 1959 to 3 September 1960. Three episodes lasted 55 minutes, and three lasted 60 minutes.

References
Mark Lewisohn, "Radio Times Guide to TV Comedy", BBC Worldwide Ltd, 2003
British TV Comedy Guide for The Arthur Askey Show

External links 
 

1961 British television series debuts
1961 British television series endings
1960s British sitcoms
ITV sitcoms